The Honorable Miss Handicap is a Grade II American Thoroughbred horse race for fillies and mares that are three years old or older over a distance of six furlongs on the dirt track scheduled annually in September at Saratoga Race Course in Saratoga Springs, New York. The event currently carries a purse of $200,000.

History

The event is named after the winning mare Honorable Miss who won the Fall Highweight Handicap twice at Belmont Park defeating male company.

The inaugural running of the event was on 3 November 1985 at Aqueduct Racetrack in Queens, New York during the NYRA Big A Fall Meeting as the Honorable Miss Stakes and was won by the three-year-old filly Schematic, who was trained by the  US Hall of Fame trainer Nick Zito in a time of 1:10.  The following year the distance of the event was increased to 1 mile, and in 1987 the event was moved to Belmont Park and held during the NYRA Fall Meeting in October.

The event was idle for four years, and NYRA resumed it they scheduled the race at Saratoga as a six-furlong sprint race.

In 1996 the event was classified as Grade III and upgraded to Grade II in 2004.

The distance for the event was increased to six and a half furlongs only for the 1993 running.

The event was run in split divisions in 2000.

Records
Speed  record:
6 furlongs:  	1:08.81 –  Minit to Stardom   (2019)

Margins:
 lengths – Wisla  (1986)

Most wins:
 2 –  	Bourbon Belle (1999, 2000)

Most wins by a jockey:
 3 – Edgar S. Prado (2002, 2003, 2009)

Most wins by a trainer:
 2 – H. Allen Jerkens (1984, 2008)
 2 – Peter W. Salmen Jr. (1999, 2000)
 2 – Steven M. Asmussen (2005, 2015)

Most wins by an owner:
 2 – George & Kay Hofmeister, Donna Salmen & Susan Bunning  (1999, 2000)

Winners

Notes:

† In 2015, La Verdad finished first but was later disqualified and unplaced for a drug violation.

See also
List of American and Canadian Graded races

References

Graded stakes races in the United States
Grade 2 stakes races in the United States
Sprint category horse races for fillies and mares
Horse races in New York (state)
Saratoga Race Course
1985 establishments in New York City
Recurring sporting events established in 1985